Sy railway station is a Belgian railway stop on Line 43 (Infrabel)  (from Liège (Angleur) to Marloie), located in the village of Sy on the territory of the municipality of Ferrières, in the Walloon Region of the province of Liège.
It is a railway stop of the National Railway Company of Belgium  (SNCB) served by Omnibus (L) and Rush hour (P) trains.

Geographical Location
Located at an altitude of 128 meters is located at Kilometric point (PK) 33.40 of the Angeleur to Marloie rail line, between Hamoir and Bomal.

History
The railway station was first put into service on October 31, 1891  by the  Belgian State Railways along the rail line from Angeleur to Marloie (opened in 1866). It is located on a curve near the bridge over the Ourthe, near a tunnel. A guard house (that has since sold to a private individual), is the only former railway building on the site.

Between March 1915 and January 1917, travelers no longer had access to the Sy railway station, which was closed and then used only by  German soldiers.

Passenger Services

Facilities
An unstaffed SNCB passenger stop, it has with two platforms with shelters and an automatic ticket vending machine.

Train Services
Sy is served by SNCB Omnibus (L) and Rush hour (P) trains.

References 

Railway stations in Belgium
Railway stations in Liège Province